Doctor Who at the BBC: The Plays is a compilation album of three original BBC audio dramas inspired by the effect of the long-running British science fiction television series Doctor Who on its fans and others.  The plays were originally broadcast separately on BBC Radio on various dates, and the compilation was released to audio CD on 4 September 2006.

Plays

Regenerations by Daragh Carville
Love and sexuality issues affect a group of friends as they prepare for an annual Doctor Who convention.  This play features appearances by Sophie Aldred and Tom Baker.

Blue Veils and Golden Sands by Martyn Wade
A dramatisation of the early days of original Doctor Who theme music performer Delia Derbyshire (Sophie Thompson) at the BBC Radiophonic Workshop.

Dalek I Love You by Colin Sharp
A man obsessed with Doctor Who brings home a mysterious woman he met at a science fiction convention.

References 

BBC Radio programmes
Works about Doctor Who
2006 compilation albums